Annett Wolf (born September 11, 1936) is a Danish director, writer producer, interviewer for TV documentaries, feature films and stage plays. Between 1962 and 1977, she worked for Danmarks Radio, the Danish Broadcasting Corporation, directing numerous in-depth profiles with artists such as Jacques Brel, Jerry Lewis, Dave Allen, Peter Ustinov and Peter Sellers. These documentaries were shot on location. In Hollywood, she directed a series of in-depth profiles with Jack Lemmon, Alfred Hitchcock, Walter Matthau and Telly Savalas. She also directed Hurray for Hollywood, a three-part documentary series about Hollywood and the American film industry.

Wolf received the Billedbladets Gyldne Rose (the Danish People's Choice Award) in 1976 for Jack Lemmon - A Twist of Lemmon, and in 1977 for Hurray for Hollywood. She then established herself as an independent Hollywood producer and directed documentaries, making-of featurettes, and trailers to promote major productions overseas. She left the United States in 1990 and resides in Halifax, Nova Scotia, Canada. She is in pre-production for the feature film So It Was.

Wolf should not be confused with her daughter, Hollywood publicist Annett Wolf Junior.

Early life 

Annett Wolf was born in Copenhagen, Denmark, the daughter of Amory and Halfdan Wolf, owner and CEO of the wine importing agency Louis Wolf. In 1955 and 1956 she was trained by expert wine makers across Europe. She joined the family business for a short period of time, but then decided to pursue her passion for theatre, history, and drama, concluding her studies in England, Scotland and Spain.

Career

1962–1976 
In 1961, Wolf began working for Danmarks Radio, the Danish Broadcasting Corporation, as a production assistant. In 1962, she started filming jazz concerts (Bud Powell at the Montmartre Jazz club) and went on producing and directing television specials with American jazz musicians such as Erroll Garner, Bill Evans, Dexter Gordon, Dave Brubeck, Stan Getz and Ben Webster. It was also at this point she began her collaboration with the Danish jazz trumpeter and composer Palle Mikkelborg, and bass player Niels-Henning Ørsted Pedersen. Mikkelborg continues to compose and arrange the scores for Wolf's films to this day. She also worked with the American jazz saxophonist Sahib Shihab, who wrote the score for two of her films: Theme in D Minor (1963), a poetic exploration of Copenhagen by night and The Girl with the Ballet Slippers (1965), a jazz pantomime conceived by Finn Methling.  The same year she co-wrote and directed Charlie Chaplin, The Man, the Clown and the Director, a three-part documentary series based on Chaplin's My Autobiography, and La Grande Famille (The Big Family), a feature documentary centered around the Spanish clown Charlie Rivel, the Rivel family and the Danish circus dynasty the Shumann's. In 1966, she convinced French mime Marcel Marceau to collaborate in writing an original visual autobiography. The Visual World of Marcel Marceau (1967) was the first color film ever broadcast by Danish TV. The drafts and final screenplay are now part of the collections of the Bibliothèque Nationale de France.

In 1969, she worked for the first time with the actor Erik Mørk, directing a television special focused on the poems and short stories by the French writer Boris Vian (Boris Vian - Erik Mørk). Throughout the 1960s Annett Wolf worked at a continuous pace, writing, producing and directing numerous documentaries and in-depth profiles each year for Danmarks Radio: musical specials (with Eartha Kitt, Bent Fabric, Juliette Gréco, Nina & Frederik and Charles Aznavour), documentaries, comedies/satires (Hov, hov). Intrigued by the technique of silent films, she produced and directed The Man Who Lost His Shoe (1969) and A Man in Search of His Soul (1971), written by Finn Methling, and starring Preben Lerdorff Rye and Berthe Quistgaard.

In addition to her broadcast career, she also worked as a theater director with her productions at the Royal Danish Theater of Micheál Mac Liammóir‘s play The Importance of Being Oscar (1970) and the Danish adaptation of the American musical revue Jacques Brel is Alive and Well and Living in Paris (1971), both starring actor Erik Mørk. Later, she adapted both productions for Danish television: Jacques Brel er i live, har det godt og bor i Paris (1974) and  En aften med Oscar Wilde (1986).

During her years at Danmarks Radio, she directed numerous in-depth profiles and interviews, often shot on location: Ord et Mord uden M (1972), an essay about the Danish poet Ivan Malinowski, The World of Jerry Lewis (1972) filmed in Sweden on the set of the unreleased film The Day the Clown Cried, The World of Peter Ustinov (1973), filmed in Geneva, The World of Peter Sellers (1975), filmed in Nice and The World of Dave Allen (1975), the profile of the Irish satirist Dave Allen. The long-form interview became Wolf’s trademark, which news reporter Joan Crosby summarized for the Oakland Tribune: 

Her admiration for the Belgium singer and lyricist Jacques Brel let her to the in-depth profile The World of Jacques Brel (1972), shot in Knokke-le-Zoute in Flanders. Fascinated with the history of the French song, she often visited Paris where she directed The World of Barbara (1972), a portrait of the French singer Barbara, and Le Temps de Vivre (1974), a three-part documentary series recording the history of French songs and ballades from the 1920s to the 1970s. The series includes original interviews with, among others, Georges Brassens, Michel Simon, Bruno Coquatrix, Serge Reggiani, Pierre Seghers, Jacques Brel, Barbara, Michel Piccoli, Georges Moustaki, Gilbert Bécaud, Serge Gainsbourg, Jane Birkin, Yves Montand, and Claude François. Her productions received critical acclaim in the national daily newspapers Politiken and Berlingske Tidende.

In 1976, she decided to take a one-year leave of absence from Danmarks Radio and went to Hollywood. With an American crew, she shot Jack Lemmon - A Twist of Lemmon, an-in-depth profile of Jack Lemmon, followed by The World of Alfred Hitchcock and Telly Savalas Alias Theo Kojak. That same year came Hurray for Hollywood, a three-part series on Hollywood and the American film industry featuring Robert Evans, John Schlesinger, Dustin Hoffman, John Cassavetes, Steven Spielberg, Michael Schultz, John Frankenheimer, Norman Jewison, Richard D. Zanuck and David Brown. This series of shows was produced in cooperation with Danmarks Radio.

1977–1990 
In 1977, director Dwight Hemion and producer Gary Smith were commissioned by the CBS television network to produce a one-hour special, Elvis in Concert. The show became Elvis Presley’s final tour. Wolf was hired to cover all the behind the scenes activities and to interview Elvis’s fans. She also interviewed Elvis Presley’s father Vernon Presley. The show was aired October 3, 1977—two months after Elvis Presley's death.

In 1978 Wolf decided to settle permanently in Los Angeles.  She wrote, produced and directed the documentary Jaws 2 – the making-of for the producers Richard D. Zanuck and David Brown.

Under contract to major studios (Universal, Paramount Pictures, 20th century Fox),  she started to shape the “making off” genre: Star Trek: The Motion Picture (1979), Paradise Alley (1978), Nighthawks (1979) Dracula (1979), starring Frank Langella, 48 Hrs. (1980), Somewhere in Time (1980), Ghost Story (1981), Missing (1982), Cat People (1982) amongst others. First under the banner of Don Stern Productions, and from 1981 on, with her own company, Mc Curry-Wolf enterprises, these documentaries, trailers, featurettes, behind the scenes and interviews, were often announced and reviewed in issues of The Hollywood Reporter and Variety, and used to promote and market the American major films overseas through United International Pictures, London.

In 1980, she also directed It's a New Day, a short documentary on new attitudes and technologies which are helping the physically handicapped overcome their difficulties. Written and produced by Fern Field for the South Bay Mayor's Committee for the Employment of the Handicapped, the film won a CINE Golden Eagle and a Silver Cindy in the Chicago International Film Festival.

In 1985 Wolf went to Stockholm to interview the Russian ballet dancer Rudolf Nureyev. Face to Face with Rudolf Nureyev was produced for ABC’s Arts Cable and Entertel, Inc.

In April 1986, a tribute was held at the American Film Institute to celebrate her 25th anniversary in the business.

In 1986 and 1987, she hosted An Evening With…, a series of live conversations in Los Angeles with guests: Dudley Moore, Sydney Pollack, Sir David Puttnam, Michel Legrand and Marcel Marceau.

In 1988, she joined advertising executive Harry Webber, directing the musical drama Crossfire. 23 young former gang members of the Bounty Hunter Bloods from the Nickerson Gardens Housing Projects in Watts told their personal stories on stage. Crossfire was credited by the Los Angeles Times as being the first serious effort by the L.A. gangs to stop a war that claimed 300 young lives every year. The taping of the play is freely and legally available to watch on the internet.

Following Crossfire, Wolf spent much of her time fundraising to help save prematurely born HIV-positive babies and support their teenage mothers before she left the United States in 1990.

Advocacy

1982–1990 
Annett Wolf also served as the Los Angeles chair of the Performing Arts Committee for Scandinavia Today, Los Angeles

In 1983, Scandinavia Today was a celebration of Scandinavian film, art and culture taking place in Los Angeles and New York. Besides chairing the event, Wolf was the presenter and interviewer of live conversations with Danish director Bille August, Swedish actors Max von Sydow, Liv Ullmann, Harriet Anderson, Ingrid Thulin and cinematographer Sven Nykvist.

In cooperation with Geoffrey Gilmore, head of the school of Theater, Film and Television at UCLA, University of California, Los Angeles the Scandinavia Today committee commissioned the complete restoration of Danish director Carl Theodor Dreyer’s 1928 avant-garde silent film classic The Passion of Joan of Arc. The Danish composer Ole Schmidt created an original score for orchestra and chorus in 1982, and the film premiered in 1983 at a live performance at the Wadsworth Theater of Performing Arts in Los Angeles.

Wolf also hosted and presented the American premier of Ingmar Bergman's drama Fanny and Alexander at the Academy of Arts and Sciences Theater in Beverly Hills.

In 1983, Wolf co-founded Women in Film and Television International (WIFTI), a global network of some 40 Women in Film Chapters worldwide with over 13,000 members dedicated to advancing professional development and achievement for women working in all areas of film, video, and other screen-based media. Wolf was the organization’s first President.

When WIFTI organized a tribute to Norman Jewison and Miloš Forman, Wolf hosted the live conversations with the two directors.

During that decade, she lectured and conducted workshops on film directing and the art of the in depth interview in UCLA, University of Southern California and the American Film Institute.

1991–2015 
In 2000, Wolf founded The Wolf Foundation, a non-profit organization established to protect and preserve the natural balance of the Arctic environment and its wildlife. In 2004 she went to Yellowknife, in the Canadian Northwest Territories to research arctic wildlife especially wolves in the Thelon Wildlife Sanctuary. Since then she has often been back to the Canadian Arctic where she continues her commitment to protect and preserve the arctic environment.

In 2005, she published her autobiography The Wolf and the Glass Eye (Ulven og Glasøjet) in Denmark.

Today, Wolf continues to lecture on documentaries and “The art of the in-depth Interview” at the University of King's College and mentors students producing the podcast “We Are Talking”, conversations with a community of thinkers, dedicated to talking through some of today’s most topical themes. Wolf also teaches film and “The art of the in-depth Interview” at Dalhousie University, Halifax. Since 2013 she has been working with students from the sustainability and environmental department at Dalhousie University researching the impact of climate change in the Inuit communities, the environment and the wildlife in the Canadian Arctic.

She's currently preparing a feature film, "A Band Of Two". The film will tell the story of a woman in her seventies. Driven by the childhood vision of an imperial white wolf, challenged and haunted by memories,  she embarks on an epic adventure in the Arctic. The project is being set up as an international co-production to be shot in the Canadian Arctic, Spain, England, Wales and Denmark.

Later events 
In January 2016, the French Cinémathèque française in Paris held a large retrospective of her body of work consisting of 25 films.
Wolf attended the event, introduced many screenings and gave a masterclass.

It was the first time her films were screened in France, and the retrospective was granted a large press coverage. French critic Jacques Mandelbaum in Le Monde newspaper called her “The lady who makes the stars open up”.

While Wolf was in Paris, French filmmaker Damien Bertrand, who also served as a curator for the retrospective, directed an hour-long in-depth profile,  Instantanés du XXe siècle : Annett Wolf  
, produced by Narratio Films. The film premiered at Cinémathèque française in March 2017  and was later broadcast on TV the same year.

In October 2017, the Danish Film Institute also held a retrospective of her body of work, which also drew much attention from the press, including a 6-page story in the national daily newspaper Politiken

Personal life 

Annett Wolf is the mother of Annett Wolf Junior, Hollywood publicist, co-founder of Wolf-Kasteler Public Relations (WK-PR agency)

Organizations 
 Wise Wolf Productions: President and Founder (2012)
 The Wolf Foundation: President and Founder (2000)
 The Wise Wolf and Friends Company, Inc.: President and Founder (Nova Scotia, 2008)

Professional affiliations 
Current
 The Association of Danish Film Directors: Member
 Women in Film and Television Atlantic: Honorary Board Member
 Women in Film and Television International (WIFTI): Honorary Board Member
 Women in Film and Television Toronto: Honorary Member

Former

 Women in Film International (Los Angeles): Co-Founder and President
 Women in Film (Los Angeles): Board member/Vice-President
 The Performing Arts Committee for Scandinavia Today (Los Angeles): Chair
 The Int'l Advisory Committee of the American Cinematheque (Los Angeles): Member
 The University of California, Los Angeles: Lecturer
 The University of Southern California (Los Angeles): Lecturer
 The American Film Institute (Los Angeles): Lecturer
 American Cinematheque (Los Angeles): Lecturer

Main filmography 

 Theme in D Minor -1964
 The Girl with the Ballet Sleeper (Pigesko) - 1965
 Charles Chaplin, the Man, the Clown and the Director (Charlie Chaplin: Mennesket, klovnen og instruktøren) - 1965
 La Grande Famille (Den Store Familie) - 1965
 The Visual World of Marcel Marceau (Le Monde Visuel de Marcel Marceau, En Mimikers Verden - Marcel Marceau) - 1967
 Fata Morgana : Nina and Frederyk - 1967
 Expo 1968 (Kvinden 68) - 1968
 Boris Vian / Erik Mørk - 1969
 The Man who Lost his Shoe (Manden der Mistede Sin ene Sko) - 1969
 A Man in Search of his Soul (En Sømand har sin Enegang) - 1971
 The World of Jacques Brel (Le Monde de Jacques Brel, Jacques Brel og hans Verden) - 1972
 Ord Er Et Mord Uden M - Ivan Malinowski - 1972
 The World of Barbara (Le Monde de Barbara, Barbara og hendes Verden) - 1972
 Danmarks Schade - Schades Danmark - 1972
 The World of Jerry Lewis (Jerry Lewis og hans Verden) - 1972
 The World of Peter Ustinov (Peter Ustinov og hans Verden) - 1973
 Le Temps de Vivre (Tid til at Leve, The Time to Live) - 1974
 The World of Peter Sellers (Peter Sellers og hans Verden) - 1975
 The World of Dave Allen - 1975
 Jack Lemmon - A Twist of Lemmon - 1976
 The World of Alfred Hitchcock (Alfred Hitchcock og hans Verden) - 1976
 The World of Walter Matthau (Walter Matthau og hans Verden) - 1976
 Telly Savalas alias Theo Kojak - 1976
 Hurray for Hollywood (Hollywood 76 / 77) - 1977
 Elvis in Concert - 1977 (writer and behind the scenes footage director)
 Jaws 2 - The Making-off -1978
 Star Trek, The Motion Picture - The Making-off -1979
 Dracula (1979) - The Making-off -1979
 48hrs. - The Making-off -1980
 Missing - The Making-off -1982
 Face to Face with Rudolf Nureyev'' -1985

References

External links 

 
 
 Annett Wolf on the Danish film database
 Annett Wolf's online film on the Danmarks Radio website
 Le Monde Visuel de Marcel Marceau : screenplay entry in the Bibliothèque Nationale de France database
 Annett Wolf of Denmark, Oakland Tribune - July 2, 1976
 Interview with Annett Wolf, August 1977, article from the Danish weekly "Billed-Bladet"
 Annett Wolf's activities coverage in Variety Magazine
 Marcel Marceau: Legacy In Motion, The Los Angeles Times, February 18, 1987
 From the Mean Streets to the Stage, by Paul Feldman, Los Angeles Times, October 27, 1988
 Hanne Risgaard meetings Annett Wolf, Copenhagen, (DR Radio Broadcast, November 2006)

Danish film producers
Film directors from Copenhagen
1936 births
Living people